Ligertwood may refer to:

Surname
Alex Ligertwood (1946-), Scottish singer, guitarist, and drummer
David Ligertwood (1969-), English cricketer
G. C. Ligertwood George Coutts Ligertwood (1888-1967), Judge of the Supreme Court of South Australia
Scott Ligertwood (1983-), Australian songwriter and guitarist for Hillsong United
John Ligertwood Paterson (1820-1882), Scottish medical doctor known for work in Bahia, Brazil